A. W. Peet (born  1968) is a professor of physics at the University of Toronto. Peet's research interests include string theory as a quantum theory of gravity, quantum field theory and applications of string theory to black holes, gauge theories, cosmology, and the correspondence between anti-de Sitter space and conformal field theories (Maldacena duality).

Early life

Peet was born in New Zealand in 1968.

Career
In 1990, Peet received a Bachelor of Science in physics from the University of Canterbury, and a doctorate in physics from Stanford University in 1994. From 1994 to 1997, they worked as a postdoctoral fellow at Princeton University, and as a postdoctoral fellow at the Institute of Theoretical Physics, University of California, Santa Barbara from 1997 to 2000. Since 2000, they have been teaching and conducting research as an established professor at the University of Toronto. Peet is also an affiliate of the Perimeter Institute for Theoretical Physics.

Peet debated their fellow University of Toronto colleague, clinical psychologist Jordan Peterson, about gender identities, on Canadian public television on several occasions, garnering significant public attention.

Personal life
Peet is non-binary, uses they/them pronouns, and is a New Zealand citizen with a passport using an unspecified gender.

Awards
2003: Radcliffe Institute for Advanced Study Fellowship, Harvard University
2002: Alfred P. Sloan Foundation Research Fellowship
2002: Ontario Premier's Research Excellence Award
2000-2006: Canadian Institute for Advanced Research Scholar, Cosmology and Gravity Program

Selected publications

References

External links

University of Toronto people
New Zealand physicists
String theorists
Living people
New Zealand non-binary people
New Zealand transgender people
Transgender academics
Transgender non-binary people
Transgender scientists
21st-century New Zealand LGBT people
Non-binary scientists
Year of birth missing (living people)